The 2009–10 daytime network television schedule for four of the five major English-language commercial broadcast networks in the United States covers the weekday daytime hours from September 2009 to August 2010. The schedule is followed by a list per network of returning series, and any series canceled after the 2008–09 season.

Affiliates fill time periods not occupied by network programs with local or syndicated programming. PBS – which offers daytime programming through a children's program block, PBS Kids – is not included, as its member television stations have local flexibility over most of their schedules and broadcast times for network shows may vary. Also not included are stations affiliated with Fox or MyNetworkTV, as the former network and the latter programming service did not offer (and continues not to offer) a daytime network schedule or network news, and Ion Television, as its schedule was composed mainly of paid programming and syndicated reruns at the time.

Legend

 New series are highlighted in bold.

Schedule
 All times correspond to U.S. Eastern and Pacific Time scheduling (except for some live sports or events). Except where affiliates slot certain programs outside their network-dictated timeslots, subtract one hour for Central, Mountain, Alaska, and Hawaii-Aleutian times.
 Local schedules may differ, as affiliates have the option to pre-empt or delay network programs. Such scheduling may be limited to preemptions caused by local or national breaking news or weather coverage (which may force stations to tape delay certain programs in overnight timeslots or defer them to a co-operated station or digital subchannel in their regular timeslot) and any major sports events scheduled to air in a weekday timeslot (mainly during major holidays). Stations may air shows at other times at their preference.

Monday-Friday

Notes:
 ABC, NBC and CBS offer their early morning newscasts via a looping feed (usually running as late as 10:00 a.m. Pacific Time) to accommodate local scheduling in the westernmost contiguous time zones or for use a filler programming for stations that do not offer a local morning newscast; some stations without a morning newscast may air syndicated or time-lease programs instead of the full newscast loop.
 (†) Many CBS affiliates returned the 3:00 p.m. ET timeslot to their affiliates starting September 21, although some stations continue to air Let's Make a Deal during the 3:00 p.m. hour to this day. In the two weeks preceding the October 5 debut of Let's Make a Deal, to fill a gap in the schedule caused by the discontinuance of Guiding Light, CBS aired repeats of The Price is Right in the timeslot.

Saturday

Sunday

By network

ABC

Returning series:
 ABC World News
 All My Children
 America This Morning
 General Hospital
 Good Morning America
 One Life to Live
 The View
 This Week
ABC Kids
The Emperor's New School 
Hannah Montana 
Power Rangers RPM
The Replacements 
The Suite Life of Zack and Cody 
That's So Raven 

New series:
ABC Kids
Mighty Morphin Power Rangers 

Not returning from 2008–09:
ABC Kids
Power Rangers Jungle Fury

CBS

Returning series:
As the World Turns
The Bold and the Beautiful
CBS Evening News
CBS Morning News
The Early Show
The Price Is Right
The Young and the Restless
Cookie Jar TV
Sabrina: The Animated Series 
Strawberry Shortcake

New series:
Let's Make a Deal
Cookie Jar TV
Busytown Mysteries
Noonbory and the Super Seven
Doodlebops Rockin' Road Show

Not returning from 2008–09:
Guiding Light
KEWLopolis
Cake 
Care Bears: Adventures in Care-a-lot
Dino Squad
Horseland
Sushi Pack

The CW

Returning series:
The CW4Kids/Toonzai
Chaotic
Dinosaur King
GoGoRiki
Huntik: Secrets & Seekers 
Kamen Rider: Dragon Knight
Skunk Fu!
Sonic X 
Teenage Mutant Ninja Turtles
Winx Club 
Yu-Gi-Oh! 5D's

New series:
 The Tyra Banks Show 
The CW4Kids/Toonzai
Rollbots
Dragon Ball Z Kai
Yu-Gi-Oh! 

Not returning from 2008–09:
4Real
The Drew Carey Show 
Everybody Hates Chris
The Game
In Harm's Way
The Jamie Foxx Show 
Judge Jeanine Pirro
Valentine
The Wayans Bros. 
The CW4Kids/Toonzai
Kirby: Right Back at Ya! 
Viva Piñata
The Spectacular Spider-Man (continues on Disney XD)
Will & Dewitt

Fox

Returning series:
Fox News Sunday
This Week in Baseball
Weekend Marketplace

Not returning from 2008–09:
4Kids TV
Biker Mice from Mars
Chaotic
Di-Gata Defenders
Kirby: Right Back at Ya! 
Sonic X 
Winx Club

NBC

Returning series:
 Days of Our Lives
 Early Today
 NBC Nightly News
 Today
Qubo
3-2-1 Penguins! 
Babar 
Jacob Two-Two
Jane and the Dragon 
My Friend Rabbit 
Turbo Dogs
The Zula Patrol

New series:
Qubo
Shelldon
Willa's Wild Life

Not returning from 2008–09:
Qubo
VeggieTales

Renewals and cancellations

Cancellations/series endings

CBS
As the World Turns—Canceled after 54 years on December 8, 2009; the series concluded its CBS run on September 17, 2010.

See also
2009–10 United States network television schedule (prime-time)
2009–10 United States network television schedule (late night)

References

Sources
 
 
 

United States weekday network television schedules
2009 in American television
2010 in American television